Kahina Takenint (born 21 May 1991) is an Algerian international footballer who plays as a goalkeeper for the Algeria women's national football team. She competed for Algeria at the 2018 Africa Women Cup of Nations, playing in three matches.

References

External links
 

1991 births
Living people
Algerian women's footballers
Women's association football goalkeepers
Algeria women's international footballers
Algerian Muslims
21st-century Algerian people